Ram Sharan Yadav (15 January 1926 – 1 September 2005) was an Indian politician. He was elected to the Lok Sabha, lower house of the Parliament of India from Khagaria, Bihar in 1989 and 1991 as a member of the Janata Dal. He joined the Indian National Congress in controversial circumstances and voted on 28 July 1993 no confidence vote which served the Narasimha Rao Government. He 
contested in 1996 as an Indian National Congress candidate but lost.

Yadav died on 1 September 2005, at the age of 79.

References

External links
Official biographical sketch in Parliament of India website

1926 births
2005 deaths
India MPs 1989–1991
India MPs 1991–1996
Lok Sabha members from Bihar
Janata Dal politicians
Indian National Congress politicians